Achille Domenico Campisiano (12 November 1837 – 17 April 1908) was an Italian-born French pianist and composer. Also known under the pseudonym Achille de Campisiano, he composed opéras comiques, operettas and opéras bouffes.

Biography

Born in Naro, in the province of Agrigento, Sicily, he was the son of Salvatore Campisiano, a jeweller, and Maria Carolina Rochia from a family of Sicilian origin who lived in Marseille. It was in Marseille that Achille Campisiano received his first tuition in musical composition, between 1850 and 1857. In 1866 he was hired by the Café de la Renaissance in Montargis. Around 1867 Campisiano replaced a Monsieur Batifort at the Cheval-Blanc, pianist and composer for the Érard concerts, around 1893.

Campisiano directed comic operas and operettas for touring companies before becoming director of the Théâtre Déjazet around 1885, where he resumed the vaudeville tradition that had once made the theatre's fortune. He attached importance to the quality of the music and entrusted parts of the production to Léon Schlesinger, Isaac Strauss's grandson.

He died in Paris aged 70 and is buried in the cemetery at Donzy.

Selected works
Achille de Campisiano wrote more than 200 works, including:

 Tu n' le voudrais pas (libretto: Philibert), c.1866
 Avec les Loups, ditty (published by A. Jacquot), c.1868 
 Du fil de la vierge, dans une goutte d'eau (published by Ch. Grou), 1869
 Absalon, operetta (Burani, Pouillon), c.1876
 Bouton d'or, opéra comique (Launay, Dharmenon), c.1882
 Un Carnaval, opéra bouffe (Pouillon, Burani), c.1882
 Les Ruses d'Amour, opéra comique (Lucien Gothi), c.1882 
 En route pour Chicago, opéra bouffe (L. Gothi), c.1882 
 Les Roses d'amour, opéra comique (L. Gothi), c.1883
 Au fond de cale, "tableau maritime musicale" (L. Gothi), c.1885
 Javotte, three-act opéra comique (Bernard Lopez), c.1886
 Le Petit Pélure d’oignon, performed at the Folies-Bergère, 1890
 En avant!, marche héroïque (Riffey et Maillot), with piano accompaniment, c.1891
 Le Domino rose, c.1896, performed at a concert du Cercle militaire, 4 February 1896
 Le Phénomène du père Magloire, operetta, Mathias, Gadix and Campisiano, c.1904

External links
 Achille de Campisiano on data.bnf.fr
 Le bouton d'Or on Stanford Opera data
 Un Carnaval on Stanford Opera data
 Les Roses d'amour on Stanford Opera data

1837 births
1908 deaths
19th-century French composers
19th-century French male pianists
20th-century French composers
20th-century French male pianists
Composers from Sicily
French operetta composers
French people of Italian descent
Musicians from the Province of Agrigento